The MF Life is the second studio album by Canadian recording artist Melanie Fiona, released March 20, 2012, on SRC Records and Universal Republic Records. Production was handled by several record producers, including No I.D., Salaam Remi, Andrea Martin, Rico Love, Los Da Mystro and T-Pain, among others. Its music expands on the traditional R&B influences of Fiona's 2009 debut album, The Bridge, and its songs deal with themes of aggrievement, longing, and romantic triumph.

The album debuted at number seven on the Billboard 200, selling 34,000 copies in its first week. It produced three singles, including the R&B hit "4 AM". Upon its release, The MF Life received generally positive reviews from music critics, who commended its production, songwriting and Fiona's vocals. Fiona promoted it with a national tour throughout March 2012. As of May 2012, the album has sold 69,500 copies in the United States.

Background and recording 
After the shutdown of Universal Motown Records, Fiona was transferred to Universal Republic Records. In an interview with Gary Graff, she said that the delay in the album's release allowed her to reach out to rappers J. Cole and Nas to contribute to the songs "This Time" and "Running", respectively.

Recording sessions for the album took place at Glenwood Place Studios in Burbank, 4220 Feng Shui Studios in Los Angeles, Circle House Studios, The Hit Factory Criteria, and Body Music in Miami, Chevy Shack  and Losta Studios in Atlanta, Summit Sound in New York, and The Armoury Vault in Toronto, Canada.

In a press release, Fiona explained the album's title, "the ‘MF’ in the album title represents my initials, but it also gets at the many facets of myself as an artist and a young woman. It can be viewed as the ‘Mighty Fine Life’ in times of triumph and success, but also the ‘Mother-F-ing Life’ when I'm dealing with frustration or misfortune. I celebrate both. I feel it would be dishonest if everything was all about glitz and glamour. It's about the balance of life, the yin and the yang, the good and the bad, all of that."

Music and lyrics 
According to Sarah Godfrey of The Washington Post, The MF Life expands on the traditional R&B influences of Fiona's debut album, with some songs Andy Kellman from AllMusic said delve into soft rock and classic soul influences. Songs such as "L.O.V.E." and "Watch Me Work" are styled in soul; the guitar-laden "Break Down These Walls" and "Wrong Side of a Love Song" have rock elements. "4 AM" draws on the hazy synth of Drake's "Marvins Room" and the emotional aesthetic of Alicia Keys' "Try Sleeping with a Broken Heart".

The album's lyrics deal with themes of longing, aggrievement, and romantic triumph. Music writers have noted Fiona's singing voice on the album as slightly husky and emotive.

Release and promotion 
The album's lead single, "Gone and Never Coming Back", peaked at number 37 on the US Billboard Hot R&B/Hip-Hop Songs. The second single, "4 AM", was sent to urban radio stations on August 30, 2011. It peaked at number eight on the Hot R&B/Hip-Hop Songs and number 81 on the Billboard Hot 100.

Originally scheduled for a 2011 release, The MF Life was released on March 20, 2012, on SRC and Universal Republic. Fiona promoted the album with a national tour throughout March 2012. It included dates at World Cafe Live in Philadelphia and the Austin Urban Music Festival in Texas.

When The MF Life was released, it sold 34,000 copies in its first week and debuted at number seven on the Billboard 200. It sold 16,200 copies in its second week on the chart. By May 2012, the album had sold 69,500 copies in the United States. In Switzerland, The MF Life charted for eight weeks and peaked at number 23. It also charted at number 32 on the United Kingdom's R&B Albums Chart.

Critical reception 

The MF Life received generally positive reviews from critics. At Metacritic, which assigns a normalized rating out of 100 to reviews from mainstream critics, the album received an average score of 75, based on nine reviews. AllMusic editor Andy Kellman found Fiona "remarkably versatile when it comes to modes of expression" and stated, "The more beneficial mix of songwriting and production collaborators ... helps make The MF Life superior to the debut in every way." Entertainment Weekly felt the "slow-burning" songs remain her strength, while Jon Caramanica from The New York Times praised the production overall and stated, "Though this album lacks some of the intensity of her debut ... it still showcases Ms. Fiona ably." Ken Capobianco of The Boston Globe viewed the album as "a more fully realized and personal set of songs than her debut", writing that "she charts the vicissitudes of love with searing conviction and style ... she ratchets up the intensity, as she co-writes nearly all of the songs and often delivers them with stunning clarity and power." Rolling Stone writer Maura Johnston called her "multidimensional" and stated, "Big-name guests ... accentuate Fiona's strengths instead of overshadowing them, a testament to her supreme confidence."

In a mixed review, Kevin Ritchie of Now felt that The MF Life is "closer to a traditional multi-producer record featuring a checklist of styles ... that showcase her technical precision as a singer but reluctance to colour outside the lines." Los Angeles Times writer Ernest Hardy viewed that Fiona's "lapses into hard, hyper-emotive singing" make the content's emotion seem ingenuine and stated, "The songs are a bit stronger this time around, but few offer much in the way of great lyrics or real insight". Alex Macpherson of Fact called the album "occasionally transcendent" and commented that it "aims more to be a well-rounded work than a visionary one, and in that respect it succeeds admirably."

Track listing

Personnel 
Credits for The MF Life adapted from liner notes.

 Johntá Austin – background vocals
 Diego Avendaño – engineer
 B.o.B – featured artist
 Bobby Brass – assistant engineer, end chorus, engineer
 Myisha Brooks – publicity
 Sandy Brummels – art direction
 Los DaMystro – conductor, producer
 Gleyder "Gee" Disla – engineer
 E – producer
 Kirk Edwards – photography
 Espionage – musician, producer
 Jay Fenix – musician, producer
 Melanie Fiona – art direction, primary artist
 Elizabeth Gallardo – assistant engineer
 Eric Goudy II – keyboards, programming
 Skye Griffin – background vocals
 George Gumbs – vocal engineer
 Tiara Hargrave – publicity
 Chuck Harmony – additional music, additional production
 Vincent Henry – guitar, saxophone
 Melantha Hodge – marketing
 Antario Holmes – keyboards, producer
 Earl Hood – keyboards, programming
 Diallobe Johnson – marketing
 Rob Kinelski – engineer, mixing
 Jason "Chyld" Kpana – A&R
 Cameron Krone – photography
 John Legend – featured artist
 Espen Lind – engineer
 Rico Love – background vocals, composer, producer
 Omar Loya – assistant engineer
 Victor Mancusi – assistant engineer, end chorus, engineer, mixing
 Fabian Marasciullo – mixing

 Rob Marks – mixing
 Manny Marroquin – mixing
 Andrea Martin – associate producer, background vocals, producer, vocal producer
 Sean McCoy – mixing assistant
 Pierre Medor – engineer
 Vlado Meller – mastering
 Ian Mercel – engineer
 Michael Michel – A&R, producer
 Carmen Murray – A&R, art direction, producer, stylist
 Francis Murray – engineer
 F. Najm – composer
 Nas – featured artist
 Scott Naughton – engineer
 Tiffany Naval – art direction
 No Id – producer, vocals
 K. Randolph – composer
 Kevin Randolph – keyboards
 Salaam Remi – arranger, bass, drums, guitar, keyboards, producer
 Tony Reyes – bass, guitar
 Steve Rifkind – producer
 Gillian Russell – A&R
 Gennaro Schiano – mixing assistant
 Lynn Scott – marketing
 Noah Shebib – vocal producer
 Jack Splash – engineer, mixing, musician, producer
 Jordan Suecof – percussion, producer, programming
 T-Pain – composer, featured artist, producer
 T-Minus – producer
 Javier Valverde – vocal engineer
 Martha Violante – stylist
 James Wisner – mixing
 Steve Wyreman – bass, composer, guitar

Charts

Weekly charts

Year-end charts

References

External links 
 
 The MF Life at Metacritic

2012 albums
Albums produced by Jack Splash
Albums produced by No I.D.
Albums produced by Rico Love
Albums produced by Salaam Remi
Albums produced by Supa Dups
Albums produced by T-Minus (record producer)
Albums produced by T-Pain
Universal Republic Records albums
Melanie Fiona albums